Brothers McClurg is an American Christian music brother duo from Buffalo, New York. They started making music in 2008, with their first studio album, Join in the Sound, released in 2012, with Integrity Music. This album was their breakthrough release upon the Billboard magazine charts, where it placed on two of them the Christian Albums and Heatseekers Albums.

Background
The Brothers McClurg took their name from their maternal grandfather, who was a pastor, Bill McClurg, while he is the musical impetus for the family and his children, Bill, Jr., Martha and Mary, and his grandchildren, Anthony and Chris Hoisington. The brothers started making music in 2008, in the Buffalo, New York-area, where they caught the attention of a major Christian music record label.

Music history
The brother duo started as a musical entity in 2008, with their first studio album, Join in the Sound, that was released on July 31, 2012, from Integrity Music. This album was their breakthrough release upon the Billboard magazine charts, where it peaked at No. 36 on the Christian Albums and at No. 22 on the Heatseekers Albums charts.

Members
 Anthony Craig Hoisington
 Christopher Lucas Hoisington
 Jeremy Thompson

Discography
Albums

References

External links
Official website 
Frequency.fm song review

American musical duos
Musical groups from New York (state)
2008 establishments in New York (state)
Musical groups established in 2008